NFL 2K3 is an American football video game released in 2002 for PlayStation 2, Xbox, and GameCube. It was developed by Visual Concepts and published by Sega. It is the only NFL 2K game for the GameCube. The cover athlete features Brian Urlacher of the  Chicago Bears, becoming the first cover athlete in the NFL 2K series besides Randy Moss.

Reception

The game received "universal acclaim" on all platforms according to the review aggregation website Metacritic. In Japan, where the PlayStation 2 version was localized for release on December 26, 2002, Famitsu gave it a score of 33 out of 40.

GameSpot named NFL 2K3 the best Xbox game, and second-best PlayStation 2 game, of August 2002. It won the publication's annual "Best Traditional Sports Game on GameCube" and "Best Traditional Sports Game on Xbox" awards, and was a runner-up for "Best Online Game on Xbox", "Best Online Game on PlayStation 2" and "Game of the Year on Xbox".

References

External links
 

PlayStation 2 games
Xbox games
GameCube games
NFL 2K video games
2002 video games
Sega video games
Video games developed in the United States